Remo Bicchierai (18 August 1938 – 9 March 2018) was an Italian professional football player.

External links
 Career summary by playerhistory.com

1938 births
2018 deaths
Italian footballers
Serie A players
Empoli F.C. players
Calcio Lecco 1912 players
Inter Milan players
Catania S.S.D. players
U.S. Pistoiese 1921 players
Association football defenders
Footballers from Florence